Partula meyeri (syn. Samoana meyeri) is a species of tropical, air-breathing land snail, a terrestrial, pulmonate, gastropod mollusc in the family Partulidae.

Etymology
The species is named in honour of its discoverer, Jean-Yves Meyer.

Distribution and habitat
P. meyeri is known only from Mount Tefatua (also called Mount Toomaru), the highest peak on the island of Raiatea in the Society Islands, French Polynesia. The holotype and two other specimens, the only ones recorded so far, were collected in a wet gulch at about 950 meters elevation, just below the mountain summit.  The three snails were observed aestivating on the leaves of montane vegetation; the typical daytime behaviour and habitat of Society Island partulids.

Description
P. meyeri has a conical spire, evenly rounded whorls, and a brown, translucent shell with whorls terminating in a large, oval aperture ( the shell length) that has a thin, expanded peristome. The shell measures approximately 16.5 mm in length and 10.5 mm in width.

References

Fauna of French Polynesia
Samoana
Gastropods described in 2007